Singer is a rural locality (a village) in Mstyora Urban Settlement, Vyaznikovsky District, Vladimir Oblast, Russia. The population was 36 as of 2010.

Geography 
Singer is located 10 km northwest of Vyazniki (the district's administrative centre) by road. Malye Lipki is the nearest rural locality.

References 

Rural localities in Vyaznikovsky District